Loretta Napoleoni (born 1955) is an Italian journalist and political analyst. She reports on the financing of terrorism, connected finance, and security related topics.

Early life and education
Napoleoni was born in Rome in 1955. She studied at Sapienza University, Rome. She holds a MPhil in International Relations and an MA in Terrorism studies from the London School of Economics (LSE). She studied as a Fulbright scholar at the Paul H. Nitze School of Advanced International Studies (SAIS), Johns Hopkins University  in Washington, D.C..She was also a Rotary Scholar at the LSE. A childhood friend was arrested for involvement in the Red Brigades and Napoleoni wrote her PhD on the group.

Career
In the early 1980s, she worked at the National Bank of Hungary on the convertibility of the Hungarian forint. This became the blueprint for the convertibility of the ruble a decade later. She is a member of the scientific committee of the Fundación Ideas para el Progreso, the think tank of Spain's Socialist Party, and she is a partner with Oxfam Italia. Napoleoni's writing has appeared in Italian newspapers such as il Caffè, La Repubblica, and Il Fatto Quotidiano.  She has worked as a foreign correspondent and columnist for the Spanish newspaper El Pais.. She is chairperson of the Club de Madrid group studying the financing of terrorism.

Selected works

References

External links

1955 births
Living people
Italian women writers
Italian writers
Italian journalists
Italian women journalists
Historians of the Iraq War
Historians of the Islamic State of Iraq and the Levant
Paul H. Nitze School of Advanced International Studies alumni
Experts on terrorism
People from Whitefish, Montana